Thilafushi is an artificial island created by government decision in 1991 as a municipal landfill situated to the west of Malé, and is located between Kaafu Atoll's Giraavaru and Gulhifalhu of the Maldives.

History

Thilafushi originally was a lagoon called "Thilafalhu" with a length of 7 km and a width of 200 metres at the shallowest regions. It came into existence following a series of discussions and efforts to resolve Malé's garbage predicament during the early 1990s. The decision to reclaim Thilafalhu as a landfill was made on 5 December 1991.

Thilafushi received its first load of garbage from Malé on 7 January 1992. Operations started with just 1 landing craft, 4 heavyload trucks, 2 excavators and a single wheel loader.

During its early years of waste disposal operations, pits (also known as cells) with a volume of 37,500 ft3 (1060 m3) were dug, after which the sand obtained from the excavation was used to construct walled enclosures around the internal perimeter of the cells. Waste received from Malé was deposited into the midst of the pit, which was topped off with a layer of construction debris and then uniformly levelled with white sand. Initially there was no segregation of the waste since it had to be disposed immediately due to mass accumulation.

Industrialization

Today Thilafushi has a landmass of more than 4.6 million ft2 (0.43 km²). The speedy terrestrial growth of Thilafushi was observed by the Government, and in November 1997, it was decided that land was to be leased to entrepreneurs interested in acquiring land for industrial purposes. Initially there were just 22 lease holders. Within the past 10 years, this number has doubled to 54 resulting in more than 1.2 million square feet (0.11 km² or 27.5 acres) of land being used currently, which generates an excess of 14 million Rufiyaa (about USD1,000,000.00) per annum. Soon after, an area of 0.2 km² (known as Thilafushi-2) was reclaimed using white sand as the filling material to provide terra firma for the more heavy industries.

The current (major) industrial activities in the island are boat manufacturing, cement packing, methane gas bottling and various large scale warehousing. The government is also planning a 50-ton incinerator facility.

In March 2015 the Maldivian government decided to relocate the central commercial port from Malé to Thilafushi.  However the deal was not completed.

Environmental issues

Environmentalists say that more than 330 tonnes of rubbish is brought to Thilafushi a day, most of which comes from Malé. In 2005 it was estimated that 31,000 truckloads of garbage are transported to Thilafushi annually, where it is dumped in large piles and eventually used to reclaim land and increase the size of the island. So much is being deposited that the island is growing at a rate of one square metre per day.

According to official statistics, a single tourist produces 3.5 kg of garbage a day, twice as much as someone from Malé and five times more than anyone from the rest of the Maldives archipelago. Altogether, that comes to "300 to 400 tons of trash" dumped on the island every day, according to Shina Ahmed, administration manager of the Thilafushi Corporation that runs the island.

Ali Rilwan, an environmentalist in Malé, said that "used batteries, asbestos, lead and other potentially hazardous waste mixed with the municipal solid wastes being put into the water. Although it is a small fraction of the total, these wastes are a source of toxic heavy metals and it is an increasingly serious ecological and health problem in the Maldives". Bluepeace, the main ecological movement of the Maldives, has described the island as a "toxic bomb".

After reports of illegal dumping surfaced, management was transferred to Malé City Council to clear up confusion to who could be responsible for the waste. The council signed a contract in 2011 with the Indian-based company, Tatva Global Renewable Energy to rehabilitate the island and manage the waste problem. However, the deal was never implemented due to bureaucracy and political interference, ultimately cancelling it.

In December 2011 the Malé City Council temporarily banned the transporting of waste to Thilafushi because of a surge in waste floating in the island's lagoon and drifting out to sea. The cause of the floating waste has been blamed on "impatient" boat captains unable to unload their waste.

In a BBC report in May 2012, the island of waste was described as "apocalyptic".

See also
 Waste management
 Natural environment

References

Further reading

Islands of the Maldives
Artificial islands of the Maldives
Landfills
1992 establishments in Asia